The 2015–16 IUPUI Jaguars women's basketball team represented Indiana University – Purdue University Indianapolis during the 2015–16 NCAA Division I women's basketball season. The Jaguars, led by sixth year head coach Austin Parkinson, played their home games at IUPUI Gymnasium (better known as The Jungle). They were members of The Summit League. They finished the season 21–11, 11–5 in Summit League play, to finish in third place. They lost in quarterfinals of the Summit League women's tournament to Omaha. They were invited to the Women's National Invitation Tournament where they defeated Central Michigan in the first round before losing to San Diego in the second round.

Roster

Schedule

|-
!colspan=9 style="background:#990000; color:#CFB53B;"| Exhibition

|-
!colspan=9 style="background:#990000; color:#CFB53B;"| Non-conference regular season

|-
!colspan=9 style="background:#990000; color:#CFB53B;"| The Summit League regular season

|-
!colspan=9 style="background:#990000; color:#CFB53B;"|The Summit League Women's Tournament

|-
!colspan=9 style="background:#990000; color:#CFB53B;"|WNIT

References

See also
2015–16 IUPUI Jaguars men's basketball team

IUPUI Jaguars women's basketball seasons
IUPUI
2016 Women's National Invitation Tournament participants
Jaguar
Jaguar